Tuoba Yulü (died 321) ruled as prince of the Tuoba Dai 316 to 321. 

He was the son of Tuoba Fu, and the father of  Tuoba Yihuai and Tuoba Shiyijian. In 310, Tuoba Yulü was ordered by Tuoba Yilu to assist Liu Kun, the Governor of Bingzhou (并州) (modern Shanxi province), to fight the Xiongnu Tiefu chieftain Liu Hu. In 316, Tuoba Yulü became the Prince of Dai upon the death of Tuoba Pugen's unnamed infant son. In 318, he defeated the Tiefu chieftain Liu Hu and also captured some territory from the Wusun. In 321 he was killed in a coup d'état launched by Pugen's widow, Lady Qi. She then installed her son, Tuoba Heru, as the new Prince of Dai.

References 
 History of the Northern Dynasties

321 deaths
4th-century murdered monarchs
Princes of Dai (Sixteen Kingdoms)
Leaders ousted by a coup
Northern Wei people
Year of birth unknown